Cape Petersen is a rounded ice-covered cape on the north side of Thurston Island, about 18 nautical miles (33 km) east-northeast of Cape Flying Fish. It was delineated from air photos taken by U.S. Navy Operation HIGHJUMP in December 1946 and named by the Advisory Committee on Antarctic Names for Carl O. Petersen, radio engineer with the Byrd Antarctic Expedition in 1928-30 and 1933–35.

Maps
 Thurston Island – Jones Mountains. 1:500000 Antarctica Sketch Map. US Geological Survey, 1967.
 Antarctic Digital Database (ADD). Scale 1:250000 topographic map of Antarctica. Scientific Committee on Antarctic Research (SCAR). Since 1993, regularly upgraded and updated.

Headlands of Ellsworth Land